Sir Edward Knatchbull, 9th Baronet,  (20 December 1781 – 24 May 1849) was a British Tory politician. He held office under Sir Robert Peel as Paymaster of the Forces between 1834 and 1835 and as Paymaster-General between 1841 and 1845.

Background and education
Knatchbull was the son of Sir Edward Knatchbull, 8th Baronet, and Mary, daughter and heiress of William Western Hugessen, of Provender House in Norton, Kent, and was educated at Christ Church, Oxford and matriculated in 1800.

He was elected  a Fellow of the Royal Society in 1802 and was called to the Bar at Lincoln's Inn in 1803. In 1819 he succeeded in the baronetcy on the death of his father.

Political career
Knatchbull was elected as a Member of Parliament (MP) for Kent at a by-election in November 1819, to fill the vacancy caused by the death of his father. He held the seat until the 1831 general election, which he did not contest.  The Reform Act 1832 split the Kent county constituency into Eastern and Western divisions, and at the 1831 general election Knatchbull was elected as one of the two MPs for the new Eastern division of Kent. He held that seat until his resignation in early 1845 by taking the Chiltern Hundreds.

In 1829 he became one of the leaders of the "Ultra-Tories" who were opposed to Catholic emancipation in Ireland. Sworn of the Privy Council in 1834, he served under Sir Robert Peel as Paymaster of the Forces between 1834 and 1835 and as Paymaster-General between 1841 and 1845.

Family
Knatchbull married twice. His first wife was Annabella Christiana Honywood, daughter of Sir John Honywood, 4th Baronet. They married on 25 August 1806 and had six children:

Mary Louisa Knatchbull (b. 1808)
Eleanor Grace Knatchbull (d. 1913)
Beatrice Joanna Knatchbull (d. 1932) (unsure as to accuracy of this date, this would make Beatrice approximately 122 years old when she died.)
Mary Dorothea Knatchbull (d. 1838)
Sir Norton Joseph Knatchbull, 10th Baronet (1808–1868)
(child, d. 1818)

Annabella died in childbirth in 1814 and on 24 October 1820, Knatchbull married secondly Fanny Catherine Knight, daughter of Edward Knight (né Edward Austen, the brother of English novelist Jane Austen). They had nine children, including:

Edward Hugessen Knatchbull-Hugessen, 1st Baron Brabourne (1829–1893)
Reverend Reginald Bridges Knatchbull-Hugessen (b. 1831)
Herbert Thomas Knatchbull-Hugessen (b. 1835)
William Western Knatchbull-Hugessen (1837–1864)

Knatchbull died in May 1849, aged 67, at the family's Mersham Hatch estate in Kent, and was succeeded in the baronetcy by his son from his first marriage, Norton. Lady Knatchbull died in December 1882.

References

External links 
 

1781 births
1849 deaths
Alumni of Christ Church, Oxford
Baronets in the Baronetage of England
Conservative Party (UK) MPs for English constituencies
Fellows of the Royal Society
Members of the Privy Council of the United Kingdom
Paymasters of the Forces
People from Mersham
United Kingdom Paymasters General
UK MPs 1818–1820
UK MPs 1820–1826
UK MPs 1826–1830
UK MPs 1830–1831
UK MPs 1832–1835
UK MPs 1835–1837
UK MPs 1837–1841
UK MPs 1841–1847
Members of Lincoln's Inn
Ultra-Tory MPs
Edward